"What I Might Do" is the debut single of Manchester-based English DJ/producer Ben Pearce. It was released by MTA Records on 11 October 2012, under exclusive licence from Under the Shade Records. The song is considered as an example of deep house music and is influenced by blues and soul. It samples the Anthony Hamilton song "Cornbread, Fish & Collard Greens". It was nominated as "Essential New Tune" by Pete Tong on BBC Radio 1. The song rose to fame in September 2013 after being featured on a Tesco F&F television advertisement, so far peaking at number seven on the UK Singles Chart. It has also charted in Belgium, Italy and the Netherlands. After its charting in September 2013, the single was re-released alongside new remixes on 14 October 2013.

Music videos
The original official music video, directed by You Ness and produced by Faye Adams, was shot around London in September 2012 and released in November 2012. It stars Rhian Chambers and Sean McPherson. A second video was released in October 2013 to coincide with the re-release of the single.

Track listing

Chart performance

Weekly charts

Year-end charts

Certifications

References

2012 songs
2013 debut singles
MTA Records singles
Deep house songs
Songs written by James Poyser